Semikarakorsk is a town and the administrative center of Semikarakorsky District in Rostov Oblast, Russia, located on the left bank of the Don River,  northeast of Rostov-on-Don, the administrative center of the oblast. Population:

History
The stanitsa of Semikarakorskaya, which was founded by the Don Cossacks, was known since 1672. The stanitsa changed its location frequently due to Don's flooding and finally was moved to its present location in 1845. It was granted urban-type settlement status in 1958 and town status in 1972.

Administrative and municipal status
Within the framework of administrative divisions, Semikarakorsk serves as the administrative center of Semikarakorsky District. As an administrative division, it is incorporated within Semikarakorsky District as Semikarakorskoye Urban Settlement. As a municipal division, this administrative unit also has urban settlement status and is a part of Semikarakorsky Municipal District.

Notable residents 

Alibek Bashkayev (born 1989), judoka
Aleksandr Podbeltsev (born 1993), football player

References

Notes

Sources

Cities and towns in Rostov Oblast
Don Host Oblast